Dabnica is a village in the Municipality of Prilep, North Macedonia.

Demographics

As of the 2021 census, Dabnica had 2 residents with the following ethnic composition:
Macedonians 2

According to the 2002 census, the village had a total of 66 inhabitants. Ethnic groups in the village include:
Romani 54
Macedonians 9
Turks 3

Notable people
Dositej Novaković, Serbian Orthodox bishop
Spiro Crne, anti-Ottoman rebel

References

Villages in Prilep Municipality